Cergy-Saint-Christophe station (French: Gare de Cergy-Saint-Christophe) is a French railway station in the city of Cergy, France. The station built by Philippe Deslandes opened on  along with Cergy–Préfecture station. It was, until 1994, the terminus for RER's line A3 but is now the penultimate stop.

The station building is a large glass structure placed above the line at street level and comprises metal and glass cylinder and Europe's largest clock.

Buildings have soon followed the station and the area is now Cergy's second shopping centre. From the station forecourt a pedestrian street leads to the plaza of the Axe Majeur from which is a view of the Vallée de l'Oise and of Paris. The axe is aligned with Paris' Champ de Mars.

External links

 
RATP.fr 

Railway stations in France opened in 1988
Gare de Cergy-Saint-Christophe
Réseau Express Régional stations
Railway stations in Val-d'Oise